Don Edwin Tillekeratne (born 20 July 1920) was a Ceylonese politician. Former Deputy Minister of Parliamentary Affairs and Sports and the member of parliament for Rathgama.

References

1920 births
Year of death missing
Deputy ministers of Sri Lanka
Members of the 5th Parliament of Ceylon
Members of the 6th Parliament of Ceylon
Members of the 8th Parliament of Sri Lanka
United National Party politicians
People from British Ceylon